Sakaengam Jitmuangnon is a Thai Muay Thai fighter. He currently trains and fights out of Jitmuangnon Camp and his natural weight is 55 kg (121 lb; 8.66 st). On the 26 November 2020, Yokkao announced that they had signed Sakaengam, along with two of his teammates: Rodtang Jitmuangnon and Nuenglanlek Jitmuangnon.

Biography 
Sakaengam was born into a poor family in Phetchabun Province. He started boxing at 9 years old because he wanted to help his family financially. His first fight came when Sakaengam was only 10 years old at a temple event in Wang Pong District, near where he lived. At the time, he weighed only 32 kg and fought under the name Daralek Sor.Prasertchai. He won the fight by decision and with it, ฿300. Four years later, at only 14 years old, Sakaengam joined the famous Jitmuangnon Camp in Nonthaburi.

Sakaengam faced Suayai Chor.Hapayak in a third time on January 20, 2023, at ONE Friday Fights 1. He won the fight via knockout in the first round.

Titles and accomplishments 
 2016 Channel 7 Stadium Fight of the Year (vs Tai Parunchai)
 2017 Siam Omnoi Stadium 105 lbs Champion
 7th annual Maabin Tournament Champion (2020)

Fight record 

|-  style="background:#fbb;"
| 2023-03-03|| Loss ||align=left| Petchbanrai Singmawynn || ONE Friday Fights 7, Lumpinee Stadium || Bangkok, Thailand || Decision (Unanimous) ||3  ||3:00
|-  style="background:#cfc;"
| 2023-01-20|| Win ||align=left| Suayai Chor.Hapayak ||   ONE Friday Fights 1, Lumpinee Stadium || Bangkok, Thailand || KO (Right cross) ||1  ||2:45 
|-  style="background:#cfc;"
| 2022-10-08 || Win ||align=left| Chatpichit SorSor.Toipadriew|| 9Muaydee VitheeThai, OrTorGor.3 Stadium || Nonthaburi province, Thailand || Decision || 5 || 3:00 
|-
! colspan="8" style="background:white" |
|-  style="background:#fbb;"
| 2022-09-14 || Loss ||align=left| Chatpichit Sor.Jor.Toipadriew  || Suk Jitmuangnon || Kalasin, Thailand || Decision || 5 || 3:00 
|-  style="background:#cfc;"
| 2022-07-27 ||Win ||align=left| Suayai Chor.Hapayak || Muay Thai Chalermprakiat + Suk Yod Muay Mahachon ||Nonthaburi province, Thailand||Decision ||5 || 3:00
|-  style="background:#fbb;"
| 2022-05-28 || Loss ||align=left| Dejphichai Navi-Andaman  || Jitmuangnont Superfight, Nonthaburi Stadium || Nonthaburi, Thailand || Decision || 5 || 3:00 
|-  style="background:#fbb;"
| 2022-04-02 || Loss ||align=left| Fahlan Por.Phetkaikaew  || Lumpinee Stadium || Bangkok, Thailand || Decision || 5 || 3:00
|-  style="background:#cfc;"
| 2021-12-25|| Win ||align=left| Sakonpat ChotBangsaen || Omnoi Stadium || Bangkok, Thailand || Decision || 5 || 3:00
|- style="text-align:center; background:#fbb;"
|2021-10-16
|Loss
| align="left" | Banluerit Siwatcharatchai
|Siam Omnoi Stadium
|Samut Sakhon, Thailand
|TKO (referee stoppage)
|3
|
|-
|-  style="background:#cfc;"
| 2021-03-26|| Win ||align=left| Yodkla Por.Wisetgym || True4U Muaymumwansuk, Rangsit Stadium || Rangsit, Thailand || Decision || 5 || 3:00
|-  style="background:#cfc;"
| 2021-02-21|| Win||align=left| Petchsarit PimsiriMuayThaiGym || MuaydeeVitheeThai, Blue Arena || Samut Prakan, Thailand || KO (Elbow)|| 3 ||
|-
|- style="background:#fbb;"
|2020-12-18
|Loss
| align="left" | Phetbanrai Singmawin
|Suk Singmawin
|Songkhla, Thailand
|Decision
|5
|3:00
|- style="background:#fbb;"
|2020-10-31
|Loss
| align="left" | Banluerit Siwatcharatchai
|Siam Omnoi Stadium
|Bangkok, Thailand
|Decision
|5
|3:00
|- style="background:#cfc;"
|2020-10-04
|Win
| align="left" | Sueyai Chor.Hapayak
|Channel 7 Stadium
|Bangkok, Thailand
|KO (right cross)
|2
|
|- style="text-align:center; background:#cfc;"
|2020-08-15
|Win
| align="left" | Banluerit Siwatcharatchai
|Maabin Tournament Final, Siam Omnoi Stadium
|Samut Sakhon, Thailand
|Decision
|5
|3:00
|-
! colspan="8" style="background:white" |
|- style="background:#cfc;"
|2020-07-11
|Win
| align="left" | Chaiyo PetchyindeeAcademy
|Maabin Tournament Semi-Final, Siam Omnoi Stadium
|Samut Sakhon, Thailand
|Decision
|5
|3:00
|- style="background:#cfc;"
|2020-02-22
|Win
| align="left" | PhetAnuwat Nor.Anuwatgym
|Maabin Tournament Quarter-Final, Siam Omnoi Stadium
|Samut Sakhon, Thailand
|Decision
|5
|3:00
|- style="background:#FFBBBB;"
|2020-01-18
|Draw
| align="left" | Phetjonkrak Wor.Sangpapai
|Siam Omnoi Stadium
|Bangkok, Thailand
|Decision
|5
|3:00
|- style="background:#cfc;"
|2019-11-18
|Win
| align="left" | Fahlan Por.Phetkaikaew
|Rajadamnern Stadium
|Bangkok, Thailand
|Decision
|5
|3:00
|- style="background:#cfc;"
|2019-10-17
|Win
| align="left" | Yodnakrob Por.Boonsit
|Rajadamnern Stadium
|Bangkok, Thailand
|Decision
|5
|3:00
|- style="background:#FFBBBB;"
|2019-09-12
|Loss
| align="left" | Yodpanum Por.Phetkaikaew
|Rajadamnern Stadium
|Bangkok, Thailand
|KO
|3
|
|- style="text-align:center; background:#cfc;"
|2019-08-07
|Win
| align="left" | Phetpanlan Phetsimuen
|Rajadamnern Stadium
|Bangkok, Thailand
|Decision
|5
|3:00
|- style="background:#cfc;"
|2019-07-13
|Win
| align="left" | Phetjonkrak Wor.Sangpapai
|Rajadamnern Stadium
|Bangkok, Thailand
|Decision
|5
|3:00
|- style="background:#cfc;"
|2019-05-03
|Win
| align="left" | Phetnakon Tor.Phettawan
|Siam Omnoi Stadium
|Samut Sakhon, Thailand
|Decision
|5
|3:00
|- style="background:#cfc;"
|2019-04-07
|Win
| align="left" | Yodnakrob Por.Boonsit
|Muay Dee Withithai, Blue Arena
|Samut Prakan, Thailand
|Decision
|5
|3:00
|- style="background:#FFBBBB;"
|2019-03-07
|Loss
| align="left" | Suntos Sor.Saranpat
|Rajadamnern Stadium
|Bangkok, Thailand
|Decision
|5
|3:00
|- style="background:#FFBBBB;"
|2019-01-31
|Loss
| align="left" | Suntos Sor.Saranpat
|Rajadamnern Stadium
|Bangkok, Thailand
|Decision
|5
|3:00
|- style="background:#FFBBBB;"
|2018-10-31
|Loss
| align="left" | Hercules Phetsimean
|Rajadamnern Stadium
|Bangkok, Thailand
|Decision
|5
|3:00
|- style="background:#FFBBBB;"
|2018-09-29
|Loss
| align="left" | Hongtae Rinmuaythai
|Siam Omnoi Stadium
|Samut Sakhon, Thailand
|Decision
|5
|3:00
|- style="background:#FFBBBB;"
|2018-08-30
|Loss
| align="left" | Yodphet Ennymuaythai
|Lumpinee Stadium
|Bangkok, Thailand
|Decision
|5
|3:00
|- style="background:#cfc;"
|2018-06-30
|Win
| align="left" | Suntos Sor.Saranpat
|Siam Omnoi Stadium
|Samut Sakhon, Thailand
|Decision
|5
|3:00
|-
! colspan="8" style="background:white" |
|- style="background:#cfc;"
|2018-05-23
|Win
| align="left" | Wanmawin Pumpanmuang
|Rajadamnern Stadium
|Bangkok, Thailand
|Decision
|5
|3:00
|- style="background:#cfc;"
|2018-04-19
|Win
| align="left" | Aikyala Yuikanchang
|Rajadamnern Stadium
|Bangkok, Thailand
|Decision
|5
|3:00
|- style="background:#FFBBBB;"
|2018-03-17
|Loss
| align="left" | Chaiyo PetchyindeeAcademy
|Rajadamnern Stadium
|Bangkok, Thailand
|Decision
|5
|3:00
|- style="background:#cfc;"
|2018-02-08
|Win
| align="left" | Waewwao Wor.Wangpom
|Rajadamnern Stadium
|Bangkok, Thailand
|Decision
|5
|3:00
|- style="background:#FFBBBB;"
|2017-11-29
|Loss
| align="left" | Tayat Aor.Pasert
|Rajadamnern Stadium
|Bangkok, Thailand
|Decision
|5
|3:00
|- style="background:#FFBBBB;"
|2017-11-01
|Loss
| align="left" | Kaipa 13Coinresort
|Rajadamnern Stadium
|Bangkok, Thailand
|Decision
|5
|3:00
|- style="background:#FFBBBB;"
|2017-08-09
|Loss
| align="left" | Mohawk Petsimuen
|Siam Omnoi Stadium
|Bangkok, Thailand
|Decision
|5
|3:00
|- style="background:#cfc;"
|2017-08-05
|Win
| align="left" | Suntos Sor.Saranpat
|Siam Omnoi Stadium
|Samut Sakhon, Thailand
|KO
|4
|
|-
! colspan="8" style="background:white" |Wins Siam Omnoi Stadium 105 lbs title
|- style="background:#cfc;"
|2017-07-07
|Win
| align="left" | Kongtoranee Ror.Kilalampang
|Lumpinee Stadium
|Bangkok, Thailand
|Decision
|5
|3:00
|- style="background:#cfc;"
|2017-06-10
|Win
| align="left" | Aikyala Yuikanchang
|Siam Omnoi Stadium
|Samut Sakhon, Thailand
|KO
|4
|
|- style="text-align:center; background:#cfc;"
|2017-04-01
|Win
| align="left" | Offside Huarongnakhaeng
|Nakhon Ratchasima
|Nakhon Ratchasima, Thailand
|Decision
|5
|3:00
|- style="background:#FFBBBB;"
|2017-03-15
|Loss
| align="left" | Tapaokaew Singmawynn
|Rajadamnern Stadium
|Bangkok, Thailand
|Decision
|5
|3:00
|- style="background:#FFBBBB;"
|2017-02-07
|Loss
| align="left" | Klapajon Lukbanyai
|Lumpinee Stadium
|Bangkok, Thailand
|Decision
|5
|3:00
|- style="background:#cfc;"
|2016-12-25
|Win
| align="left" | Tai Parunchai
|Channel 7 Stadium
|Bangkok, Thailand
|Decision
|5
|3:00
|- style="background:#cfc;"
|2016-10-10
|Win
| align="left" | Lanyakaew Kiatyothin
|
|Thailand
|Decision
|5
|3:00
|- style="background:#FFBBBB;"
|2016-07-08
|Loss
| align="left" | Sian Parunchai
|Lumpinee Stadium
|Bangkok, Thailand
|Decision
|5
|3:00
|- style="background:#cfc;"
|2016-06-05
|Win
| align="left" | Tai Parunchai
|Channel 7 Stadium
|Rangsit, Thailand
|Decision
|5
|3:00
|- style="background:#cfc;"
|2016-05-15
|Win
| align="left" | Lanyakaew Kiatyothin
|Rangsit Stadium
|Rangsit, Thailand
|Decision
|5
|3:00
|- style="background:#cfc;"
|2016-04-22
|Win
| align="left" | Ninmunkkon Or.Sabaitae
|Lumpinee Stadium
|Bangkok, Thailand
|Decision
|5
|3:00
|- style="background:#FFBBBB;"
|2016-03-28
|Loss
| align="left" | Tai Parunchai
|Nakhon Si Thammarat
|Thung Song, Thailand
|Decision
|5
|3:00
|- style="background:#cfc;"
|2016-02-05
|Win
| align="left" | Tai Parunchai
|Lumpinee Stadium
|Bangkok, Thailand
|Decision
|5
|3:00
|-
|- style="background:#FFBBBB;"
|2015-11-15
|Loss
| align="left" | Phetarer Sedakobwatsaduphan
|Channel 7 Stadium
|Bangkok, Thailand
|KO
|4
|
|- style="text-align:center; background:#cfc;"
|2015-09-25
|Win
| align="left" | Kengklan Numpomthep
|Lumpinee Stadium
|Bangkok, Thailand
|Decision
|5
|3:00
|- style="background:#cfc;"
|2015-09-04
|Win
| align="left" | Wankert Sipsonong
|Lumpinee Stadium
|Bangkok, Thailand
|Decision
|5
|3:00
|- style="background:#cfc;"
|2015-08-07
|Win
| align="left" | Wankert Sipsonong
|Lumpinee Stadium
|Bangkok, Thailand
|Decision
|5
|3:00
|- style="background:#fbb;"
|2015-01-18
|Loss
| align="left" | Kaduaklek Kor.Komkiew
|Channel 7 Stadium
|Bangkok, Thailand
|Decision
|5
|3:00
|-
| colspan=9 | Legend:

References 

1993 births
Sakaengam Jitmuangnon
ONE Championship kickboxers 
Living people
Sakaengam Jitmuangnon